Sevzheldorlag (also Sevzheldorstroy, Northern Railway ITL)  was a penal labor camp of the GULAG system in the USSR. The full name was  Северный железнодорожный исправительно-трудовой лагерь НКВД, Northern Railway Corrective Labor Camp of NKVD.  Established on May 10, 1938, on July 24, 1950 it was merged with North Pechora ITL to make the Pechora ITL. Top head count was 84, 893 (January 1941). The main operation was railroad construction.  The sites of the camp were within Komi ASSR, East Siberia: at Kotlas railway station, Knyazhpogost settlement (including headquarters), and Zheleznodorozhny settlement (now the town of Yemva).

Administration
:ru:Шемена, Семён Иванович, Camp chief (May 10, 1938 – 1940)

Notable inmates
Hava Volovich
Sergey Korolyov (1940–1944)
:ru:Шрейдер, Михаил Павлович (October–December 1940, transport to the camp, 1942 – released to leave for the front of the Great Patriotic War)
Jalmari Virtanen, :ru:Виртанен, Ялмари Эрикович (1938 – April 2, 1939)
Archbishop Varlaam (:ru:Варлаам (Пикалов)) (1942, among several other camps)
Matvey Amagayev (:ru:Амагаев, Матвей Иннокентьевич) (1940 – August 18, 1944)
:ru:Гавронский, Александр Осипович, film director; was director of the inmate theatre in Sevzheldorlag
:ru:Евгенов, Николай Иванович (1888–1964), hydrographer and oceanologist (Knyazhpogost, June 1940–February 1941; meteorologist)
:ru:Максимов, Сергей Сергеевич (1916–1967), writer (1936–1941)
:ru:Бабареко, Адам Антонович (1899–1938), Belarusian writer (Knyazhpogost, May–November 1938)

References

Camps of the Gulag